Tabidia insanalis is a moth of the family Crambidae. The species was described by Pieter Cornelius Tobias Snellen in 1879. It is found on Borneo, Sulawesi, Papua New Guinea and Queensland, Australia.

Adults are brown with wavy white bands outlined in dark brown on the wings.

The larvae are green with brown speckles on the thorax and tail.

References

Moths described in 1879
Pyraustinae